Central-Western Region or Central West Region can refer to:
Central-West Region, Brazil
Central-Western Region, Venezuela
Central West Queensland, a region of Australia
Central West (New South Wales), a region of Australia

See also
Central West
Midwest (disambiguation)